17th BSFC Awards
December 13, 1996

Best Film: 
 Trainspotting  
The 17th Boston Society of Film Critics Awards honored the best filmmaking of 1996. The awards were given on 13 December 1996.

Winners
Best Film:
Trainspotting
Best Actor:
Geoffrey Rush – Shine
Best Actress: 
Brenda Blethyn – Secrets & Lies
Best Supporting Actor:
Edward Norton – The People vs. Larry Flynt, Primal Fear and Everyone Says I Love You
Best Supporting Actress: 
Courtney Love – The People vs. Larry Flynt
Best Director:
Mike Leigh – Secrets & Lies
Best Screenplay: 
Stanley Tucci and Joseph Tropiano – Big Night
Best Cinematography: 
John Seale – The English Patient
Best Documentary:
Anne Frank Remembered
Best Foreign-Language Film: 
My Favorite Season (Ma saison préférée) • France
Best New Filmmaker: 
Campbell Scott and Stanley Tucci – Big Night

External links
Past Winners

References
Boston crix nix most U.S. pix; ‘Night,’ ‘Flynt’ score Variety
1996 Boston Society of Film Critics Awards Internet Movie Database

1996
1996 film awards
1996 awards in the United States
1996 in Boston
December 1996 events in the United States